Rafael Alsua (18 August 1923 – 30 November 1992) was a Spanish footballer. He played in two matches for the Spain national football team in 1954. He was also named in Spain's squad for the Group 6 qualification tournament for the 1954 FIFA World Cup.

References

External links
 

1923 births
1992 deaths
Spanish footballers
Spain international footballers
Association football forwards
Real Unión footballers
CA Osasuna players
Real Madrid CF players
Real Sociedad footballers
Racing de Santander players
Real Oviedo players
Real Jaén footballers
Spanish football managers
Racing de Santander managers
Sportspeople from Irun
Footballers from the Basque Country (autonomous community)